Every Child may refer to:

EveryChild, a UK-based not-for-profit international children's charity
Every Child (film), an animated short film for UNICEF
Every Child Ministries, a US-based Christian charity for African children
 "Every Child", a song by Raffi on his Raffi Radio album